Sésostris was a paddle steamer, initially built as a postal steamer for the Near Eastern service of the Messageries Maritimes. In 1852, she became a steam aviso in the French Navy.

Career 
From 1853 to 1854, Sésostris cruised off Western Africa under Lieutenant Chastenet.

In 1855, she was re-armed with mortars for the Crimean War, notably taking part in the Battle of Kinburn.

In 1859 and 1860, she performed oceanographic surveys off Newfoundland.

Struck in 1861, she was used as a floating mechanics workshop until 1894. She was eventually broken up in 1896.

Legacy 
A model of Sésostris is on display at the Musée national de la Marine in Paris.

Notes, citations, and references
Notes

Citations

References
 

1836 ships
Ships built in France
Crimean War naval ships of France
Avisos of the French Navy